Volodymyr Vasylovych Mykolayeko (Ukrainian: Володимир Васильович Миколаєнко; born in 8 April 1960), is a Ukrainian politician who served as the mayor of Kherson from 2015 to 2020.

On 25 May 2014, at the extraordinary elections, Mykolayenko was elected the mayor of Kherson. 

He was re-elected as the mayor of Kherson in the next local elections after two rounds (25 October and 15 November 2015, respectively).

Biography
He is a participant of the Euromaidan, after which on 28 May 2014, he was elected mayor of Kherson.

During the events related to the annexation of Crimea and military aggression in the East of Ukraine, Kherson became a strategic temporary border city. During the protests in the East of Ukraine, he expressed his tough position on preventing provocations in Kherson and the impossibility of seizing the city by separatist groups.

In 2015, he was elected mayor, gaining 24.81% of the votes in the 1st round (20,903 votes), in the second round - 67.78% of the votes (37,532 votes). 

His successor is Ihor Kolykhaiev, who took office in 2020.

In April 2022, Mykolayenko's wife have stated that he had been abducted by Russian occupiers in Kherson and his current whereabouts are unknown.

Income

In 2017, Mykolaenko submitted an electronic declaration for 2016.

References

1960 births
Living people
Mayors of Kherson